Francis Reilly could refer to: 

Frank Reilly (footballer) (Francis Reilly, 1894-1956), Scottish footballer
Joe Reilly (Australian footballer) (Francis Joseph Reilly, 1916-2003)

See also
Francis O'Reilly (1922-2013), Irish businessman